Tereza Ramba, née Voříšková (born 29 June 1989, Prague) is a Czech film and television actress. She has notably played the role of Beruška in the 2008 film The Country Teacher. She has also played roles in Zemský ráj to na pohled, Peklo s princeznou and Bobule.

She was a student at the Prague Conservatory, majoring in music drama. She also dances professionally for Fantasy Studio.

Filmography 

2005: Rafťáci
2006: Ro(c)k podvraťáků
2006: Místo v životě (TV series)
2007: The Country Teacher (Venkovský učitel)
2007: Trapasy (TV series)
2007: Svatba na bitevním poli aneb Hodiny před slávou aka The Wedding on Battle Field (International: English title)
2007: Překažené dostaveníčko
2007: Grapes
2008: Soukromé pasti (TV series)
2008: Bobule (https://www.csfd.cz/film/233933-bobule/prehled/)
2008: Peklo s princeznou
2008: Než se táta vrátí (TV series)
2008: Kanadská noc (TV film)
2008: Ďáblova lest (TV series)
2008: Černá sanitka (TV series)
2008: BrainStorm (TV film)
2009: Peklo s princeznou aka It is Hell with the Princess (International: English title)
2009: An Earthly Paradise for the Eyes
2009: Little Knights Tale
2009: 2Bobule
2011: Alois Nebel
2011: Borgia (TV series)
2012: Missing (US TV series)
2013: Rozkoš
2014: Všiváci
2015: Život je život
2015: Laputa
2015: Padesátka
2016: A Vote for the King of the Romans (TV film)
2017: Po strništi bos
2018: Chata na prodej
2020: Vlastníci
2023: Docent (TV series)

References

Further reading
 Tereza Voříšková in the Osobnosti.cz portal
 Česko-Slovenská filmová databáze: Tereza Voříšková

External links 
 

1989 births
21st-century Czech actresses
Actresses from Prague
Czech child actresses
Czech female dancers
Czech film actresses
Czech television actresses
Living people
Prague Conservatory alumni
Czech Lion Awards winners